Miotragocerus, also known as the European eland, is an extinct species of antelope that once lived in Europe in 10 to 8 million years ago. They were most likely browsers, according to their fossilized teeth and jaw shape. They were likely to have lived near bodies of water, such as many antelope species today.

References

Fossil taxa described in 1928
Extinct mammals of Europe
Bovines